Stefanie Melbeck (born 16 April 1977 in Hamburg) is a retired German handball player. She last played for the club Buxtehuder SV, and has earlier played for the Danish clubs Randers HK and KIF Kolding.

She won a bronze medal with the German national team at the 2007 World Women's Handball Championship.

She participated at the 2008 Summer Olympics in China, where the German team placed 11th.

References

1977 births
Living people
German female handball players
Handball players at the 2008 Summer Olympics
Olympic handball players of Germany
Sportspeople from Hamburg
Expatriate handball players
German expatriate sportspeople in Denmark